Alan Grigsby Sues (March 7, 1926 – December 1, 2011) was an American actor and comedian widely known for his roles on the 1968–1973 television series Rowan & Martin's Laugh-In.

Sues's on-screen persona was campy and outrageous. Typical of his humor was a skit that found him following a pair of whiskey-drinking cowboys to a Wild West bar and requesting a frozen daiquiri. His recurring characters on the program included "Big Al the Sportscaster", "Uncle Al the Kiddies' Pal", and "Jo Anne Worley", after Worley left the show.

Early life
Alan Grigsby Sues was born on March 7, 1926, in Ross, California, to  Alice (née Murray) and Melvyn Sues, who raised racehorses, requiring the family to move frequently. He served in the U.S. Army in Europe during World War II.

Career
Sues used his GI Bill benefits to pay for acting lessons at the Pasadena Playhouse, where he performed, later making his Broadway debut in the stage play Tea and Sympathy, directed by Elia Kazan, which had a successful run in New York City beginning in 1953. During this period, he met and married Phyllis Gehrig, a dancer and actress, subsequently starting a vaudevillian nightclub act in Manhattan — with which they toured North America before divorcing in 1958.

After touring the country with his wife, he got more work in stand-up comedy (at Reuben Bleu and Blue Angel, both clubs in Manhattan), worked with Julius Monk, and joined an improv/sketch group with The Mad Show, which led to his being cast in Laugh-In. Outside of Laugh-In, he appeared in the classic Twilight Zone episode "The Masks", in a non-comedic role. He also had supporting roles in the films Move Over, Darling (1963) and The Americanization of Emily (1964).

After Laugh-In, Sues portrayed Professor Moriarty onstage in Sherlock Holmes (opposite John Wood, and later Leonard Nimoy), which, according to Alan, was "one of my favorite roles, because it's so against type, and I loved the makeup". The makeup for Moriarty was used in several books about makeup as an example of shadowing and technique.  Sues appeared in television commercials for Peter Pan Peanut Butter during the 1970s, as a tongue-in-cheek, klutzy Peter Pan. He toured with Singin' in the Rain, playing the Elocution Instructor. He also appeared in several movies, and provided voiceovers including Oh! Heavenly Dog and Rudolph and Frosty's Christmas in July.

During the 1970s, Sues appeared as a celebrity guest on some popular game shows of the era, including The Movie Game, Celebrity Sweepstakes, The Cross-Wits and Liar's Club.

Later years and death
Sues appeared in the short films Lord of the Road (1999) and Artificially Speaking (2009), the latter making its premiere at the 2009 Dances With Films festival in Los Angeles.

In 2008, fifty years after their divorce, Sues and his former wife, Phyllis, conducted a lengthy interview at his home for her website.

Sues died on December 1, 2011, at Cedars-Sinai Medical Center, Los Angeles, where he was taken after suffering an apparent heart attack while watching television with his beloved dog, Doris, according to his partner and accountant, Michael Michaud.

Stage
Tea and Sympathy (1953–1955) — Ralph
Happy Birthday (1956)
The Mad Show (1966–1967) Off-Broadway
Good News (1972)  — Kenley Players (Ohio)
The Adventures of Sherlock Holmes (1974–1976) — Professor Moriarty
The Three Musketeers (1976)
Singin' in the Rain (national tour 1995–1999) — Director/elocutionist
Two for the Show (1998–2000) — One-man stage show, multiple characters

Filmography

Films
 Move Over, Darling (1963) — Court Clerk
 The Wheeler Dealers (1963) - Whitby
 The Americanization of Emily (1964) — Officer Enright
 Raggedy Ann and Andy: A Musical Adventure (1977)  — Sir Leonard Looney (voice)
 Oh! Heavenly Dog (1980) — Freddie
 The Reluctant Dragon (1981) — The Dragon (voice)
 Snowballing (AKA Smooth Moves) (1984) — Roy
 A Bucket of Blood (1995) — Art Buyer
 Lord of the Road (1999)
 Artificially Speaking (2009) — Sparky Schlosser

Television
 The Twilight Zone (episode: "The Masks"; 1964) — Wilfred Harper, Jr.
 The Wild Wild West (1965) — Matt Dawson
 The Doris Day Show (episode: "The Relatives;" 1968) - Edgar
 Rowan & Martin's Laugh-In (1968–1972) — Regular performer
 Rudolph and Frosty's Christmas in July (1979) — Scratcher the jealous Reindeer (voice)
 The Brady Brides (episode: "Cool Hand Phil"; 1981) — Duke
 Punky Brewster (episode: "Tangled Web"; 1987) — Andre Sockstein
 Sabrina, the Teenage Witch (episode: "Good Will Haunting"; 1998) — Bellevuedere

Sues also appeared in two episodes of "Love, American Style".

References

External links
 
 

1926 births
2011 deaths
American male comedians
American male film actors
American male television actors
American sketch comedians
American LGBT artists
People from Ross, California
Male actors from the San Francisco Bay Area
United States Army personnel of World War II
American gay actors
Burials at Forest Lawn Memorial Park (Hollywood Hills)
21st-century American LGBT people